Arachnura scorpionoides is a species of drag tail spider, in the genus Arachnura, native to Congo, Ethiopia, Madagascar and Mauritius. A specimen of this species has recently been seen (January 2013) in Nairobi, Kenya, East Africa. The specimen laid over 65 eggs which later hatched, therefore making Arachnura scorpionoides a native species of Kenya.

References 

Araneidae
Spiders of Africa
Spiders described in 1863